Howard Reid (born 1951) is a British documentary film maker and anthropologist.

He has a PhD from Cambridge University and has made films for the BBC and Channel 4 relating to ancient civilizations and ancient religions.

Bibliography

 In Search of the Immortals - Mummies, Death and the Afterlife, Headline Books, London, 1999, 
 Arthur the Dragon King - The Barbaric Roots of Britain's Greatest Legend, Headline Books, London, 2001,

References

British documentary filmmakers
British anthropologists
Living people
Alumni of the University of Cambridge
1951 births